Lucky Me is the third and final studio album by the American hardcore punk band Killing the Dream. The album was released on November 22, 2010 through Deathwish Inc.

The title of the album is said to be "sarcastic in a sense, but is really genuine in another" by vocalist Elijah Horner, who saw himself as lucky to be where he was in his life during the recording of Lucky Me.

Track listing
All songs composed by Elijah Horner, except where noted.
 "Blame the Architects" – 3:27
 "Walking, Diseased" – 2:37
 "Testimony" (Kurt Travis) – 3:07
 "Past of a Saint (We Were Thieves)" – 2:35
 "Part IV: Sinner's Future" – 1:17
 "Hell Can Wait" (Larrah Feliciano, Horner) – 2:13
 "Black" (Horner, Chad Roberts)	– 3:49

Personnel
Killing the Dream
 Chris Chase – bass
 Isaac Fratini – drums
 Pat Guild – guitar
 Elijah Horner – vocals, lyrics
 D.J. Rogers – guitar

Additional musicians
 Larrah Feliciano – composing, lyrics
 Chad Roberts (Havilland) – composing, lyrics
 Anna Stosich – violin
 Kurt Travis (ex-Dance Gavin Dance, ex-A Lot Like Birds) – vocals

Recording and packaging
 Jacob Bannon (Converge) – artwork, design
 Pat Hills – production
 Zack Ohren – production

References

Killing the Dream albums
2010 albums
Deathwish Inc. albums
Albums with cover art by Jacob Bannon